Tricholoma aestuans is a mushroom of the agaric genus Tricholoma. First described formally by Elias Magnus Fries in 1821, it was transferred to the genus Tricholoma by Claude Casimir Gillet in 1874.

See also
List of North American Tricholoma
List of Tricholoma species

References

Fungi described in 1821
Fungi of Europe
Fungi of North America
aestuans
Taxa named by Elias Magnus Fries